Wang Noi is a district (amphoe) in Ayutthaya province, Thailand, 50 km north of Bangkok. The population of Wang Noi were mostly farmers but now this area is industrial.

Geography
The district is in the southeastern part of Ayutthaya province. Neighboring districts are (from the east clockwise) Nong Khae, Saraburi province, Nong Suea and Khlong Luan of Pathum Thani province, and Bang Pa-in and Uthai of Ayutthaya province.

History
The district was split off from Uthai District in 1907. At first named Uthai Noi (อุทัยน้อย), it was renamed Wang Noi in 1917.

Economy
As the district lies along a long stretch of Phahonyothin Road (National Highway 1) as it leaves Greater Bangkok, Wang Noi has become a logistics hub, hosting warehouses for a broad range of industries. The district is the site of one of Thailand Post's (THP) fully automated sorting centers. , THP is negotiating to purchase 100 rai of land to house the facility.

Administration
The district is divided into 10 sub-districts (tambon), which are further subdivided into 68 villages (muban). Lam Ta Sao is a sub-district municipality (thesaban tambon), which covers the whole sub-district Lam Ta Sao and parts of Bo Ta Lo, Lam Sai, and Chamaep. There are a further nine tambon administrative organizations (TAO) for the non-municipal areas.

References

External links
amphoe.com (Thai)

Wang Noi